This article displays the rosters for the teams competing at the 2019 Women's Afrobasket. Each team had to submit 12 players.

Group A

Egypt

Ivory Coast

Senegal
The squad was announced on 6 August 2019.

Group B

Cameroon

Nigeria
The squad was announced on 9 August 2019.

Tunisia

Group C

Angola

DR Congo
The squad was announced on 8 August 2019.

Mali

Group D

Cape Verde

Kenya

Mozambique

References

External links
Official website

Squads
AfroBasket Women squads